Breezy Point can refer to a community in the United States:

Breezy Point, Minnesota, a city in Crow Wing County
Breezy Point, Queens, New York, a neighborhood on the Rockaway Peninsula

See also
 Point Breeze (disambiguation)
 Breezy (disambiguation)
 Point (disambiguation)